Louis Dubois (1830–1880) was a Belgian painter who specialized in landscapes and Portraits in a naturalistic style. He also painted genre and still-life subjects.

Personal life 
Louis Dubois was born in 1830 in Brussels, Belgium. He died of a respiratory illness in Brussels in 1880 at the age of 50.

Free Society for the Fine Arts
Louis Dubois belonged to a group of artists who, in the style of the second half the 19th century, rebelled against the traditional painting of the past in favor of the style of this period. With the painters Théodore Baron, Louis Artan, Edmond Lambrichs, F. Foudin, on 1 March 1868, he became one of the founders of La Société Libre des Beaux-Arts. 

The society was officially established in 1868 as "Comité de Salut Public révolutionnaire, pour la libération de l'Art" according to Lucien Solvay. The society members scorned the rules of the Academy and the aesthetics currently accepted; the artists of the "Free Society for the Fine Arts" freely and uniquely interpreted nature and reality, without following a common discipline, and stated their motto: "Liberté et Sincerité"  and thus started a vehement controversy.

To make known and spread their realist philosophy, in 1871 they created "L'Art Libre" an art and literary journal under Leon Dommartin's direction; it was published on the 1st and 15th of each month (the first was published on 15 December 1871).

Louis Dubois, as the principal illustrator and the only painter-editor, was the most argumentative.

Under the pseudonym "Hout" (Dutch translation of Dubois), in his alert, precise style, Dubois criticized traditional painting in his stories.  In his well-respected lampoons, he spoke from the perspective of good sense, logic, sincerity, truth.

Criticism
On 1 January 1872, Duboi published under the title "Les Biographes et les Biographies" a critique of his professional enemies, The Romantics of the school of 1830 (published again in "L'Art Moderne, Revue artistique des Arts et de la Litterature" No 24 of the 4th year, Sunday, 15 June 1884. 

On 1 February, and 1 March 1872, "Le Peintre d'Histoire" spoke against past painters of the so-called "Modern Era." 

On 15 July and 15 August 1872, "Du Portrait" criticized official portraits on natural skins. 

On 15 September and 1 October 1872, in his article "Du Procédé" Dubois said, "paint as you like . . . provided that you use true tones, in the right places."

On 11 February 1873, after 10 years of publication, the Review underwent a transformation, expanding under the title "L'Art Universel"; Camille Lemonnier became the director. "Hout" the published an article "A propos des peintres du rire" (Frans Hals, Jordeans, Jan Steen, the triad of painters of good spirits).

Dubois is also given credit for the articles signed "Karl Stur," in "L'Art Libre" and in the daily newspaper "La Chronique" (lead article "Causerie"), during the years 1870–1871.

Paintings
Dubois worked in Paris at Thomas Couture's studio, which was active from 1847 to 1863. He also found himself in the company of Félicien Rops, Charles Hermans, Constantin Meunier, Jules Raeymaeckers, among the attendees of the "Atelier Libre Saint-Luc" in Brussels from 1853 to 1863, then directed by Slingeneyer – an association of young painters gathered to work together.

Dubois exhibited for the first time at the Brussels Exhibition of 1857 where he showed three paintings "Joueurs" (Players), "Embuscade" (Ambush), and "Prêtre allant célébrer la Masse" (Priests going to celebrate Mass).

At an 1860 show, Dubois showed the great work "Les Cigognes" (The Storks), (shown at Spa that same year) painted in 1858, "La Roulette" (both of which today hang in the Royal Museum of Fine Arts in Brussels) and a study called "Enfant de choeur" (Choir Child) (this remained in his family and is now on display in Maui, Hawaii in the home of his great great granddaughter Maureen Vernon Breen); in 1863 "Solitude" (formerly "Le Chevreuil mort [dead Deer]) (also now on display in the Royal Museum in Brussels) shows the dead animal outstretched in the middle of a silent forest.

Associates
Dubois considered as his friends: Courbet, Louis Artan, Félicien Rops, Constantin Meunier, Alfred Verwee, Joseph Coosemans. Alfred Verhaeren, Jean-François Taelemans (1851–1931), and Théodore Baron were his students, and Frans Van Leemputten (1850–1915) followed his influence.

Camille Lemonnier wrote: "Master Louis Dubois, I saved him for last, like a hot pepper for a bored palate. Zounds! What painting! I recognized the power of another with distinction." Edmond About said about him, "he was the most distinguished painter working in Belgium."

Legacy 
Twenty-one of Dubois' paintings and those of his students were displayed at the 1880 Brussels Artistic and Literary Circle; and in 1891 at the Arts and Press Expo. 

His works were also displayed at the 

 1905 Belgian Art Retrospective in Brussels
 1906 at the Belgian Art Exhibition at Guild Hall in London
 1907 Belgium Autumn Art Show in Paris
 1910 Brussels Show: The Free Aesthetic Evolution of a Landscape (5 panels)
 1920, at Anvers: Chosen Work of the Belgian Masters (Louis Dubois, 4 paintings)
 1922 Brussels Artistic and Literary Circle (5 panels)
 1923 Belgian Art Show, in Paris
 1926 Belgian Art Show, in Bern
 1927 Belgian Art Show, in London
 1930, at the Centennial Art Expo of Belgian Art in Brussels, at the Third Salon (Show) at Namur, 
 1931, at the Belgian Art Show in Copenhagen
 Belgian Art Show at Expo of the Century
 Expo of Women's Portraits in Brussels, 
 1932, at the Brussels Fine Arts Palace, Retrospective of the Masters of La Societe Libre des Beaux-Arts, Artan, Dubois, De Grouz, Verwee, Meunier, Rops, Baron, Smits (Dubois 61 paintings)
 1935 Brussels Universal and International Expo, "Five Centuries of Art" (Dubois 3 paintings).

The Brussels Museum has 15 of Dubois' works on display, the Ixelles Fine Arts Museum displays five paintings, the Charlier-Van Custen Museum displays three paintings, the Gand Fine Arts Museum displays three works, the Tournai Fine Arts Museum displays works.  

The Ostende Fine Arts Museum displayed three of his paintings, but they were destroyed during World War II,

References

The vast majority of the information above is taken from a National Biography published by the Royal Academy of Sciences, Letter and Fine Arts of Belgium, Excerpt from the 42nd Volume, prepared by the firm of Emile Bruylant, Legal and Scientific Publications Corporation, 67 La Regence Street, 1964.
 

1830 births
1880 deaths
Artists from Brussels
19th-century Belgian painters
19th-century Belgian male artists